Attention Shoppers may refer to:

 Attention Shoppers!, an album by Starz
 Attention Shoppers, an album by Nero's Day at Disneyland
 "Attention Shoppers" (Flashpoint), an episode of Flashpoint
 Attention Shoppers (film), a 2000 film starring Nestor Carbonell
 "Attention Shoppers", a short story by Steven Brust

See also 
 "Attention Kmart shoppers", a phrase associated with the discount retail chain Kmart